Darya Sergeyevna Lantratova (born in 20 May 1984), is a Russian politician who is currently the senator of the executive authority of the Luhansk People's Republic since 20 December 2022.

Biography

Darya Lantratova was born in Mosrentgen, Moscow Oblast on 20 May 1984. In 2006, she graduated from the Moscow State Pedagogical University. In 2022 - from the Academy of National Economy and Public Administration. Since 2008, she has worked in the apparatus of the government of the Russia. Since 2012, she has been in the presidential administration of Russia (in 2019 she was appointed assistant to the Presidential Administration for Public Relations and Communications)..

On 20 December 2022, the acting head of the Luhansk People's Republic, Leonid Pasechnik, approved Lantratova as a senator of within the Federation Council, a representative of the executive authority of the republic, wwhile she retained the position of deputy secretary of the General Council of the United Russia party. On 23 December, during the meeting of the Federation Council she in confirmed to the chamber.

On 25 February 2023, Lantratova was added to the EU sanctions list among other individuals and organisations supporting the 2022 Russian invasion of Ukraine. According to the decision of the EU Council, "In taking on and acting in this capacity [as the representative of the illegally annexed so-called “Luhansk People’s Republic”], she is therefore supporting actions and policies which undermine the territorial integrity, sovereignty and independence of Ukraine.

References

1984 births
Living people
United Russia politicians
Members of the Federation Council of Russia (after 2000)
Russian individuals subject to European Union sanctions